Carl Weisbrod is an American public sector executive and urban development expert. He is currently a senior advisor to HR&A Advisors and a Senior Fellow at the New York University Marron Institute of Urban Management.

Weisbrod most recently served as Chairman of the New York City Planning Commission and Director of the New York City Department of City Planning.

He is a former member of the Board of the Metropolitan Transportation Authority  and was the founding President of the New York City Economic Development Corporation.

Weisbrod has also served as the President of the New York City Downtown Alliance, as an executive vice president of Trinity Church and President of Trinity Real Estate, the $6 billion the real estate development arm of the church. Weisbrod served as one of the chairs of Mayor-elect Bill de Blasio's transition team, as President of the 42nd Street Development Corporation he is credited with the redevelopment of New York City's Times Square area.

References

Living people
Commissioners in New York City
1945 births